Birbal Trilogy Case 1: Finding Vajramuni or simply known as Birbal is a 2019 Indian Kannada-language crime thriller film written and directed by MG Srinivas. The film is the first instalment of the Birbal Trilogy.The movie also marked the third character based trilogy in Kannada after CID 999 and Sangliyana.

Rukmini Vasanth made her debut as lead actress. This movie introduced 8D song for the first time in Kannada. This was the first Kannada movie to use the Scribble effect. This was also the first time that VFX had been done in Canada for a Kannada film. Its sequels are titled Birbal Trilogy Case No. 2: Avrn bitt, Ivrn bitt, Ivryaru? and Birbal Trilogy Case No. 3: Turremane.

The movie was praised for employing the Rashomon Effect in its story narration technique. The movie is based on the 2017 Korean movie New Trial. The Telugu remake of the film Thimmarusu released on 30 July 2021. The movie was also reported to be remade in Tamil.

Plot
One rainy midnight a cabdriver is murdered on the road, bartender (Vishnu) who was going home after work sees this and informs the police. But the Police arrests Vishnu as a culprit and create evidence against him. The court seeing the fabricated evidence gives him a life-Sentence.

After few years, young intelligent lawyer(Mahesh Das) joins the law-firm whose intention is to provide justice for the weaker section of society.

Mahesh chooses to take on Vishnu's case and wants to reopen the case, while Vishnu is on Parole.

Cast
 M. G. Srinivas as Mahesh Das, a lawyer
 Rukmini Vasanth as Jahnvi, Mahesh's girlfriend
 Madhusudhan Rao as Inspector Raghavan
 Sujay Shastry as Shastry
 Vineeth Kumar as Vishnu
 Suresh Heblikar as Hegde, a law firm head
 Ravi Bhat as Ram Das
 Aruna Balraj as Sumitra, Vishnu mother
 Keerthi Baanu as Retired Inspector Vajramuni
 Krishna Hebbale as Partha Sarathi, Public Prosecutor
 Kavitha Gowda in a cameo appearance

Music

Songs composed by Saurabh Vaibhav and Kalacharan and released under the label of Crystal Music

Track list

Original soundtrack of the movie composed by Saurabh Vaibhav, Saurabh lokhande and released under label of Crystal Music.

Original soundtrack

Release
The movie released on 18 January 2019 and gained highly positive reviews from audience. The director's efforts, an engaging screenplay, the cast's performance and the background score received praise from both, the audiences as well as the critics. It was reported that Hindi film makers had approached the director and producer for the remake rights. The movie released on online platform Amazon Prime on 20 April 2020.

References

External links
 

2010s Kannada-language films
2019 films
Films shot in Karnataka
Indian nonlinear narrative films
Indian mystery thriller films
2010s mystery thriller films
Films about murder
Indian detective films
Kannada films remade in other languages